The 2007 FIA GT Oschersleben 2 Hours was the fifth round of the 2007 FIA GT Championship season.  It took place at Motorsport Arena Oschersleben on July 8, 2007.

The results of this race were pending due to an appeal by disqualified race winner PK Carsport.  The FIA chose to allow the results stand following a review, although PK Carsport is still appealing through civil court.

Official results
Class winners in bold.  Cars failing to complete 75% of winner's distance marked as Not Classified (NC).  Cars with a C under their class are running in the Citation Cup, with the winner marked in bold italics.

† – #4 PK Carsport and #7 All-Inkl.com Racing entries were both disqualified for failing post-race inspection.  The #4 PK Carsport entry was the race winner prior to disqualification, but had a fuel tank 1.3 liters larger than the legal limit.  The #7 All-Inkl.com Racing entry had a gearbox final gear ratio that was not approved by the FIA.

Statistics
 Pole Position – #4 PK Carsport – 1:24.492
 Average Speed – 146.70 km/h

External links
 Official FIA GT website – Race Results

O
FIA GT Oschersleben